

Incumbents 

 Monarch: Elizabeth II
 Governor-General: Rodney Williams
 Prime Minister: Gaston Browne

Events 
Ongoing — COVID-19 pandemic in Antigua and Barbuda

 1 January – 2020 New Year Honours
 13 March – Prime Minister Gaston Browne confirms the first case of COVID-19 in Antigua and Barbuda.
 28 March – A state of emergency is declared due to the COVID-19 pandemic.
 1 June – Antigua and Barbuda reopened its borders to international travelers in a phased approach. Phase 1 allows arriving passengers to present a valid medical certificate stating a negative COVID-19 test result within the previous 48 hours. Visitors without a negative COVID-19 certificate are allowed entry on the condition that they quarantine at an approved hotel. Returning nationals without a certificate must submit to mandatory quarantine.

Sports 

 March 12 – The 2019–20 Antigua and Barbuda Premier Division is suspended due to the COVID-19 pandemic. The 2020–21 season is cancelled.

References 

 
2020s in Antigua and Barbuda
Years of the 21st century in Antigua and Barbuda
Antigua and Barbuda
Antigua and Barbuda